People with the given name Jae:

Korean
 Jae (Korean name), for a list of Korean given names containing the element "Jae"
 Jae Hee (born 1980), South Korean actor 
 Jae Ko, Korean artist
 Jae Lee (born 1972), Korean-American comics artist
 Jae Park (born 1992), Korean-American musician, singer, songwriter, rapper, and composer
 Jae Yoo (born 1989), South Korean model

Non-Korean
 Jae Ang (born 1982), Singaporean singer 
 Jae R. Ballif (born 1931), American author and provost 
 Jae Kingi-Cross (born 1976), Australian basketball player
 Jae Crowder (born 1990), American basketball player 
 Jae Deal (born 'unknown'), American composer, arranger, music producer, and orchestrator
 Jae Head (born 1996), American actor 
 Jae Jarrell (born 1935), American artist 
 Jae Liew (born 1990), Singaporean actress
 Jae Martin (born 1976), English football midfielder
 Jae Millz (born 1983), American rapper 
 Jae Synth (born 1980), American music producer and disc jockey
 Jae Thaxton (born 1985), American football linebacker

Fictional characters
 Jae Juun, a fictional character in the Star Wars Expanded Universe
 Jae Lee (Lost), a character on the television series Lost

Given names